Spino is a genus of achilid planthoppers in the  family Achilidae, found in Central America. There are at least two described species in Spino.

Species
These two species belong to the genus Spino:
 Spino cretaceus Fennah
 Spino notatus (Fowler, 1904)

References

Achilidae
Auchenorrhyncha genera